Gorenje Karteljevo is a settlement in the hills north of the town of Novo Mesto in southeastern Slovenia. The entire City Municipality of Novo Mesto is part of the traditional region of Lower Carniola and is now included in the Southeast Slovenia Statistical Region.

The local church is dedicated to the Primus and Felician and belongs to the Parish of Mirna Peč. It is a medieval building that was restyled in the Baroque in the 17th century.

References

External links
Gorenje Karteljevo on Geopedia

Populated places in the City Municipality of Novo Mesto